Wisconsin Hayride was the first major label release  by Gumball. The EP, Recorded and Released in 1992, was a teaser set to capitalize on the Alternative rock boom of the time before they could spend time recording a proper full length. Wisconsin Hayride is an all covers EP featuring songs by Mahavishnu Orchestra, Black Flag, Foetus, Small Faces and The Damned.

Track listing 
 "New Rose" - (Brian James)
 "Tell Me Have You Ever Seen Me" - (Ronnie Lane, Steve Marriott)
 "Butterfly Potion" - (JG Thirwell)
 "Depression" - (Greg Ginn)
 "Awakening" - (John McLaughlin)

Personnel 
Don Fleming - lead vocals, guitar
Jay Spiegel - drums, lead vocals on "Tell Me Have You Ever Seen Me"
Eric Vermillion - bass, lead vocals on "Depression"
J Mascis - guitar on "New Rose" and "Depression"
Butch Vig - producer, engineer, mixing
Steve Marker - producer, engineer, mixing
Greg Calbi - mastering

References 

1992 EPs
Albums produced by Butch Vig
Gumball (band) albums